Ann Bowling may refer to:
Ann Patricia Bowling (born 1951), British sociologist 
Ann T. Bowling (1943–2000), American biologist

See also
Ann Dowling (born 1952), British mechanical engineer